Rappers are used to transmit strong shearing forces to collecting plates in order to release deposited dust particles. Rapping is the process by which electrodes and particles are broken apart by vibrations from the rappers. Often used in electrostatic precipitators, rappers relapse the caked on dust layer which then descends into a hopper. Number, size, and frequency of the rappers vary from system to system based upon the specific characteristics of the dust being collected.

Rappers & precipitators 
Typically such vibrators are employed in conjunction with electrostatic precipitators. Precipitators contain sheet metal collector electrode plates. Vertically suspended discharge electrode wires are located between the plates. As a gas stream, often discharged from an industrial process, flows through the precipitator, air particulates are ionized by the electrode wire. The ionized particles then are attracted to the positively grounded plate, creating a layer of caked on dust particles. Rappers are responsible for Transmitting vibrations to the electrodes causing deposited dust particles to break loose and fall into a hopper located below the precipitator.

Types 
Generally the three types of rappers are:
Pneumatic, or electromagnetic impulse units
Electric vibrators
Mechanical hammers, anvils

Electric vibrators use rods that extend through the precipitator shell to transmit vibrations to the discharge wires and/or collecting plates and are not typically used in scenarios involving fly ash. The electromagnetic vibrator consists of a coil that is energized by alternating current. The energy creates a vibration transmitted through a rod to the wires or plates.

Mechanical rappers consist of a large weight that is lifted to gain potential energy and then released, allowing it to fall and collide with an anvil creating a shock to dislodge caked-on dust.

Pneumatic rappers can be either type, vibratory or impact.

Tumbling hammers, typically used in conjunction with rigid frame discharge electrodes, are highly efficient but require a lot of maintenance when employed in a moving gas stream. Hammers are connected to a rotating shaft. As they revolve, the hammers collide with a beam, causing a vibratory shock to dislodge caked-on dust. The hammer’s weight and mounting arm length control the intensity of the rapping. Adjusting the speed of the rotating shaft alters the frequency of rapping.

Design considerations 
Rapping systems are designed primarily based on two factors, the internal suspension system and the number of surfaces affected by the rapping vibrations. Pneumatic rappers apply the greatest shock. The materials and design of a rapper system must be able to withstand high energy forces. Moreover, dust must be dislodged successfully without causing a lot of re-entrainment.

Each installation has a unique intensity and period of vibration at which the system will produce the greatest collecting efficiency. For example, low intensity causes significant buildup of dust on discharge wires ultimately limiting the power input to the precipitator due to a reduction in sparkover distance between electrodes. Furthermore, low intensity represses the formation of negative corona. Buildup can also affect the standard distribution of electrostatic forces, thereby causing oscillation of the discharge wires and high-tension frame.

The intensity of the vibrations is regulated via adjustments in air pressure to provide diversity in force needed to clean various types of discharge electrode systems. This feature allows for rapping of event the most delicate systems.

Rapping plays a key role in total emissions due to re-entrainment. Therefore, the rapping system must be designed and adjusted to minimize re-entrainment of particles into the gas stream.

Common weaknesses 
Essentially, the high energy repeated motion created by the rappers is the source of their wear. The consistent high intensity vibrations cause fatigue and wear on the rappers. Bolted joints are especially affected by this repetitive motion and must be replaced. Frequent failure of air in inlet fittings is another issue that arises from the motion. Repeated vibrations cause fittings to dull down and pipe threads break off, therefore, loosening the fittings.

See also 
Electrostatic precipitator
Dust Collector

References

External links
Evaluating Electrostatic Precipitator Rapper Performance
Precipitator Rapping Systems

Air pollution control systems